Redvers may refer to:

Places
Redvers, Saskatchewan, a town in Canada

People
Redvers (given name), including a list of people with the name
Kelvin Redvers, First Nations filmmaker
Redvers family

See also
Redvers Airport, an abandoned airport in Saskatchewan, Canada
Redvers House, an office building in Sheffield, England